Kellie's Castle (sometimes also called Kellie's Folly) is a castle located in Batu Gajah, Kinta District, Perak, Malaysia. The unfinished, ruined mansion, was built by a Scottish planter named William Kellie-Smith. According to differing accounts, it was either a gift for his wife or a home for his son. Kellie's Castle is situated beside the Raya River (Sungai Raya), which is a small creek to the Kinta River.

Background 

William Kellie-Smith (1870–1926) was born in 1870 in Kellas, Moray Firth, Scotland. In 1890, at the age of 20, he arrived in Malaya as a civil engineer. He joined Charles Alma Baker's survey firm, who had won concessions from the state government to clear 9,000 hectares of forests in Batu Gajah, Perak. With the substantial profits made from his business venture with Baker, Kellie-Smith bought 1,000 acres (405 ha) of jungle land in the district of Kinta and started planting rubber trees and dabbled in the tin mining industry.

In time, he named his estate "Kinta Kellas" after his home farm "Easter Kellas". Kellie-Smith went on to own the Kinta Kellas Tin Dredging Company as well. With his fortune made, he returned home to marry his Scottish sweetheart, Agnes, and brought her over to Malaya in 1903. They had a daughter named Helen the following year.

History
Construction on a mansion started in 1910 called the Kellas House, which would eventually become the castle. With the birth of Kellie-Smith's son in 1915, he started planning for a huge castle with Moorish, Indo-Saracenic and Roman designs.  

Kellie-Smith brought in 70 craftsmen Madras, India. All the bricks and marble were imported from India too. Included in the plan was a four-floored building with 14 rooms and an elevator (Malaya's first), it also included underground tunnels, secret rooms, a tennis court, a wine celler and hidden stairways. Also, the bricks and tiles made for the castle were brought from India.

During construction, a virulent strain of Spanish flu struck his workmen in 1918. When his workmen approached him to build a temple nearby,  Kellie-Smith readily agreed. In return for his generosity, they built a statue of him beside the other deities on the lord murugan temple wall. It is believed that a tunnel was built to the temple from the castle. Descendants of the Tamil labourers brought over to Malaya to work on the mansion still live nearby.

William Kellie-Smith died at the age of 56 of pneumonia during a short trip to Lisbon, Portugal in 1926. William's wife was devastated and decided to move back to Scotland; construction on the castle was never completed by the workers and the castle was left abandoned in the jungle. In the end, Kellas House, later known as "Kellie's Folly" or "Kellie's Castle," was sold to a British company called Harrisons and Crosfield.

Kellie's Castle is now a popular local tourist attraction. It was used as a setting in the 1999 film Anna and the King and 2001 film Skyline Cruisers.

The castle saw recent developments to its physical condition for the comfort of its tourists, a restaurant was also made across the river opposite the castle. During school holidays, the castle would have as much as 500 to 700 people visiting daily.

In 2015, Kellie's Castle was the site of the first ever 24-hour comic challenge in a castle. A collaboration between Port Ipoh and the Malaysian Comic Activist Society (PEKOMIK) and Malaysian Animation Society (ANIMAS), the event took place on 21–22 March 2015 and was claimed as the "scariest" 24 hour comics challenge.

See also

 List of tourist attractions in Perak

References

External links
 Tourism Malaysia - Kellie's Castle
 Kellie's Castle, Perak at Journey Malaysia
 Cameron Highlands Malaysia - Kellie's Castle
 A documentary video about Kellies Castle at TourMalaysia.com
 Kellies Castle at TraveltoPerak.com
 Ipoh City Attration - Kellies Castle at ipoh-city.com

Buildings and structures in Perak
Kinta District
Unfinished castles
Houses in Malaysia
Tourist attractions in Perak